Derskanova is a rural locality (a village) in Yorgvinskoye Rural Settlement, Kudymkarsky District, Perm Krai, Russia. The population was 28 as of 2010.

Geography 
Derskanova is located 28 km northeast of Kudymkar (the district's administrative centre) by road. Shaburova is the nearest rural locality.

References 

Rural localities in Kudymkarsky District